Judge Reed may refer to:

Edward Cornelius Reed Jr. (1924–2013), judge of the United States District Court for the District of Nevada
Henry Thomas Reed (1846–1924), judge of the United States District Court for the Northern District of Iowa
James Hay Reed (1853–1927), judge of the United States District Court for the Western District of Pennsylvania
John A. Reed Jr. (1931–2015), judge of the United States District Court for the Middle District of Florida
Lowell A. Reed Jr. (1930–2020), judge of the United States District Court for the Eastern District of Pennsylvania
Scott Elgin Reed (1921–1994), judge of the United States District Court for the Eastern District of Kentucky

See also
Inez Smith Reid (born 1937), judge of the District of Columbia Court of Appeals
Justice Reed (disambiguation)